Chhaeb District is a district located in Preah Vihear Province, in northern Cambodia. According to the 1998 census of Cambodia, it had a population of 12,450. The population recorded by the 2008 census was 16,731.

Administration
As of 2020, the district contains the following khums (communes).

References

Districts of Preah Vihear province